Ghulan Mohammed Hotak is a citizen of Afghanistan.

Both The Daily Telegraph and the Washington Post published extended accounts of Hotak's defection from the Taliban to the Interim Afghan Government.

During his Combatant Status Review Tribunal and Administrative Review Board Guantanamo captive Gholam Ruhani testified he believed Hotak was an assisting American intelligence on December 9, 2001, the day he was captured.
Ruhani testified that the baker whose shop was next to him was acquainted with Hotak, and recommended he call upon Ruhani to serve as a translator between Hotak, another militia leader named Abdul Haq Wasiq, and some Americans.

Hotak was reported to have been captured on July 17, 2004.
Hotak was reported to have switched allegiance to the Taliban when they started to rise to power in the early 1990s, and to have changed allegiance again to Hamid Karzai as the Taliban fell.  Hotak was honored at a ceremony on May 5, 2004 to celebrate the surrender of hundreds of weapons.

Hotak was captured in Wardak, along with his brother and nephew, "because they links to the Taliban".

Hotak is reported to have lobbied the Karzai government to reward his defection from the Taliban with the Governorship of his Province.
700 of his supporters were reported to have demonstrated, in the Provincial capital, to protest his arrest.

The Afghan TV channel Ariana'' describes Hotak as the "Taliban's chief commander".

References

Living people
Taliban members
Pashtun people
Year of birth missing (living people)